Tobías Nahuel Figueroa (born 2 February 1992) is an Argentine professional footballer, who plays as a striker for Curicó Unido.

Career
Figueroa made his professional debut with Belgrano in the Argentine Primera División, he played the final few minutes in a 2–0 win against Atlético Tucumán on 2 May 2011. That was one of six appearances to come in his first four seasons. In January 2014, Figueroa joined Almirante Brown in Primera B Nacional. He made his debut against Banfield, before scoring his first career goal in his following match versus Villa San Carlos. In total, Figueroa scored three goals in twenty games in 2013–14 as they were relegated. Figueroa completed a loan move to fellow Primera B Nacional team Crucero del Norte in August 2014.

One goal in thirteen appearances followed as Crucero were promoted to the 2015 Argentine Primera División. 2015 saw him leave Belgrano on a temporary basis for a third occasion, this time by joining Primera División side Sarmiento. His first goal for Sarmiento came on 21 March, against former team Crucero del Norte. He returned to Belgrano in December after twenty matches and three goals for the Junín-based outfit. On 16 January 2016, Figueroa signed for Primera B Nacional club Guillermo Brown on a two-season loan. He went onto score twenty-seven goals in fifty-nine fixtures for the second tier side.

In January 2018, Figueroa left Argentine football to join Unión Española of the Chilean Primera División on loan. He scored on his debut by getting the winning goal in an away win at the Estadio Nacional Julio Martínez Prádanos versus Universidad de Chile on 4 February. He followed that with a hat-trick in a 4–4 draw with Curicó Unido on 26 February. His loan with Unión Española ended at the end of November, having scored fourteen times for them. Figueroa sealed a return to Chile with Deportes Antofagasta on 24 January 2019.

On 22 January 2022, Figueroa  joined Saudi Arabian club Al-Tai.

Career statistics
.

References

External links

1992 births
Living people
Sportspeople from Córdoba Province, Argentina
Argentine footballers
Association football forwards
Argentine expatriate footballers
Expatriate footballers in Chile
Argentine expatriate sportspeople in Chile
Expatriate footballers in Saudi Arabia
Argentine expatriate sportspeople in Saudi Arabia
Primera Nacional players
Argentine Primera División players
Chilean Primera División players
Saudi Professional League players
Club Atlético Belgrano footballers
Club Almirante Brown footballers
Crucero del Norte footballers
Club Atlético Sarmiento footballers
Guillermo Brown footballers
Unión Española footballers
C.D. Antofagasta footballers
Al-Tai FC players
Curicó Unido footballers